Suser avgårde is the first studio album by Norwegian rock band deLillos. It was re-released in 2005 as a double-disc Deluxe Edition including part one of Kjerringvikdemoen.

Track listing
"Min beibi dro avsted"
"Mine øyne"
"Tøff i pysjamas"
"Nå som vi alle er forskjellige"
"Knut (Er det sant)"
"Siste sommerferiedag"
"Finnes det en kvinne"
"Full men pen"
"La la la"
"Livet er en liten dings"
"Hei jeg er tilbake"
"Suser avgårde alle mann"

Deluxe Edition also includes the following tracks from Kjerringvikdemoen :

Hva har du tenkt?
Jeg er på vei hjem nå
Livet er en liten dings
Hei jeg er tilbake
Suser avgårde alle mann
Tøff i pysjamas
Walking on a river
Nå som vi alle er forskjellige
Siste sommerferiedag
Min beibi dro avsted
Soppesmørbrød
Skulle bare være morsom
Fugl i bur
Johnny Fredrik

1986 debut albums
DeLillos albums
Sonet Records albums